Chrysoteuchia is a genus of moths of the family Crambidae described by Jacob Hübner in 1825. Most are native to Asia.

The cranberry girdler (C. topiarius) is a pest of turfgrasses in North America. It also attacks cranberry and fir.

There were about thirty species in the genus as of 2010.

Species

Chrysoteuchia argentistriellus (Leech, 1889)
Chrysoteuchia atrosignatus (Zeller, 1877)
Chrysoteuchia culmella (Linnaeus, 1758) - garden grass-veneer 
Chrysoteuchia curvicavus Song & Chen in Chen, Song & Yuan, 2001
Chrysoteuchia daisetsuzana (Matsumura, 1927)
Chrysoteuchia deltella Song & Chen in Chen, Song & Yuan, 2001
Chrysoteuchia dentatella Song & Chen in Chen, Song & Yuan, 2001
Chrysoteuchia diplogrammus (Zeller, 1863)
Chrysoteuchia disasterella Bleszynski, 1965
Chrysoteuchia distinctellus (Leech, 1889)
Chrysoteuchia dividellus (Snellen, 1890)
Chrysoteuchia fractellus (South in Leech & South, 1901)
Chrysoteuchia fuliginosellus (South in Leech & South, 1901)
Chrysoteuchia funebrellus (Caradja in Caradja & Meyrick, 1937)
Chrysoteuchia furva Li & Li, 2010
Chrysoteuchia gonoxes (Bleszynski, 1962)
Chrysoteuchia gregorella Bleszynski, 1965
Chrysoteuchia hamatella Chen, Song & Yuan, 2001
Chrysoteuchia hamatoides Song & Chen in Chen, Song & Yuan, 2001
Chrysoteuchia hyalodiscella (Caradja, 1927)
Chrysoteuchia lolotiella (Caradja, 1927)
Chrysoteuchia mandschuricus (Christoph, 1881)
Chrysoteuchia moriokensis (Okano, 1958)
Chrysoteuchia ningensis Li, 2012
Chrysoteuchia nonifasciaria Li & Li, 2010
Chrysoteuchia picturatellus (South in Leech & South, 1901)
Chrysoteuchia porcelanellus (Motschulsky, 1861)
Chrysoteuchia pseudodiplogrammus (Okano, 1962)
Chrysoteuchia pyraustoides (Erschoff, 1877)
Chrysoteuchia quadrapicula Chen, Song & Yuan, 2003
Chrysoteuchia rotundiprojecta Li & Li, 2010
Chrysoteuchia shafferi Li & Li, 2010
Chrysoteuchia sonobei (Marumo, 1936)
Chrysoteuchia topiarius (Zeller, 1866) - topiary grass-veneer moth, subterranean sod webworm, cranberry girdler 
Chrysoteuchia yuennanellus (Caradja in Caradja & Meyrick, 1937)

References

Crambini
Crambidae genera
Taxa named by Jacob Hübner